Richard Finch may refer to: 

 Richard Finch (boxer), Australian boxer who competed at the 1984 Summer Olympics
 Richard Finch (golfer) (born 1977), English professional golfer 
 Richard Finch (musician) (born 1954), American musician
 Richard Finch (Quaker)

See also
 Finch (surname)